Digama malgassica is a moth of the family Erebidae first described by Hervé de Toulgoët in 1954. It is found in Madagascar.

References

External links
Zwier, Jaap. "Sommeria malgassica Toulgoët 1954". Aganainae. Retrieved September 20, 2019.

Aganainae
Moths of Madagascar
Moths of Africa
Moths described in 1954